Campillos is a municipality and town in the province of Málaga, part of the autonomous community of Andalusia in southern Spain. It is located northwest of the province in the comarca of Guadalteba and within the judicial district of Antequera. The municipality is approximately 30 kilometers from Antequera and 70 from the provincial capital. It covers an area of 188 km2 extending from grain fields and olive groves and includes several lakes inhabited by flamingos and storks.

It has a population of approximately 8,633 residents according to the National Institute of Statistics (2012). The parish church Our Lady of Repose, Iglesia Parroquial Nuestra Señora del Reposo, near the plaza is a major attraction. The natives are called Campilleros.

Campillos was founded in 1492.

Geography
Campillos is part of the comarca of Guadalteba, together with the municipalities of Almargen, Ardales, Cañete La Real, Carratraca, Cuevas del Becerro, Sierra de Yeguas and Teba.

Flora and fauna
Most of the land is covered by olive groves and grain fields on its flat side and the mountains are dominated by scrub and woodland.

References

Municipalities in the Province of Málaga